The Men's 50 kilometre freestyle event of the FIS Nordic World Ski Championships 2017 was held on 5 March 2017.

Results
The race was started at 14:30.

References

Men's 50 kilometre freestyle